This is the progression of world record improvements of the 300 metres hurdles M60 division of Masters athletics.

Key

References

Masters Athletics 300 m hurdles list

Masters athletics world record progressions